Senator Massie may refer to:

Bland Massie (1854–1924), Virginia State Senate
Mike Massie (born 1954), Wyoming State Senate
Nathaniel Massie (1763–1813), Ohio State Senate

See also
Senator Massey (disambiguation)
Senator Mazzei (disambiguation)